Smolnitsa Landscape Conservation Area was a nature park which was located in Ida-Viru County, Estonia.

The area of the nature park was 242 ha.

The protected area was founded in 1967 to protect the dunes of Peipus Lake's northern coast and its biodiversity. In 2021, the protected area was incorporated to Alutaguse National Park.

References

Nature reserves in Estonia
Geography of Ida-Viru County